Swiss 1. Liga may refer to:
Swiss 1. Liga (football), fourth tier of the Swiss football league system
Swiss 1. Liga (ice hockey), fourth tier of the Swiss ice hockey league system
Swiss Promotion League or Swiss 1. Liga Promotion, third tier of the Swiss football league system